Jeppe Brinch Vilhelmsen (born 8 May 1995) is a Danish footballer who plays as a centre back for Danish 1st Division side FC Fredericia.

Club career

Esbjerg fB
Brinch is a product of Esbjerg and which he joined at the age of five. He was promoted to the first team squad in the summer 2014 alongside two other U19 players.

Brinch got his debut on 26 September 2013 against Aalborg Chang in the Danish Cup, which Esbjerg won 7–1. He played his first match in the Danish Superliga on 27 July 2014 against SønderjyskE. He came on the pitch in the 59th minute, replacing Jonas Knudsen.

In December 2015, Brinch extended his contract for the rest of the season. He played 13 league matches for the club in the 2015/16 season and extended his contract once again in April 2016, this time until 2019.

FC Fredericia
On 1 September 2021, Brinch joined fellow league club, FC Fredericia, on a deal until June 2023.

References

External links
 
  Jeppe Brinch on DBU

Living people
1995 births
Association football central defenders
Danish men's footballers
Danish Superliga players
Danish 1st Division players
Esbjerg fB players
FC Fredericia players
Denmark youth international footballers